Andrzejówka may refer to the following places:
Andrzejówka, Łódź Voivodeship (central Poland)
Andrzejówka, Biłgoraj County in Lublin Voivodeship (east Poland)
Andrzejówka, Hrubieszów County in Lublin Voivodeship (east Poland)
Andrzejówka, Lesser Poland Voivodeship (south Poland)
Andrzejówka, Masovian Voivodeship (east-central Poland)